Mustafa Kemal Atatürk is an outdoor sculpture of Mustafa Kemal Atatürk, installed outside the Embassy of Turkey, Washington, D.C. (1625 Massachusetts Avenue), in the United States. It is one of two statues in Embassy Row depicting Kemal Atatürk; the other was installed outside the Turkish Ambassador's Residence (1606 23rd Street NW), on the periphery of Sheridan Circle, in 2013.

References

Embassy Row
Monuments and memorials in Washington, D.C.
Statue
Outdoor sculptures in Washington, D.C.
Sculptures of men in Washington, D.C.
Statues in Washington, D.C.
Statues of Mustafa Kemal Atatürk